The Treasury Board of Canada Secretariat (TBS) is the administrative branch of the Treasury Board of Canada (the committee of ministers responsible for the financial management of the federal government) and a central agency of the Government of Canada. The role of the Secretariat is to support the Treasury Board and to provide advice to Treasury Board members in the management and administration of the government.

The Treasury Board Secretariat is headed by the secretary of the Treasury Board, currently Peter Wallace, who is responsible to Parliament through the president of the Treasury Board, currently Mona Fortier.

Function
The TBS assists the Treasury Board, which functions as the government's management committee by overseeing the operations of the federal government as a whole and serving as the principal employer of the core public administration. The TBS is also responsible for supporting the Treasury Board in its comptrollership role, providing oversight of the financial management functions in departments and agencies.

TBS offices are located primarily at 90 Elgin Street, Ottawa, Ontario, though there are several smaller offices elsewhere in Ottawa/Gatineau, as well as regional offices throughout Canada.

Secretary
In February 2018, Prime Minister Justin Trudeau announced that Peter Wallace, who was then city manager for the Toronto government and formerly had been secretary of the Cabinet in the Government of Ontario and head of the Ontario Public Service, was to become secretary of the Treasury Board on 4 April 2018. He was previously secretary to the Ontario Treasury Board for three years, and deputy minister of finance in the federal government.

Current Structure of Treasury Board Secretariat
President of the Treasury Board
Secretary of the Treasury Board 
Associate Secretary
Chief Human Resources Officer
Comptroller General of Canada
Assistant Secretary, Corporate Services Sector
Assistant Secretary, Economic Sector
Assistant Secretary, Expenditure Management Sector
Assistant Secretary, Government Operations Sector
Assistant Secretary, International Affairs, Security and Justice Sector
Assistant Secretary, Priorities and Planning Sector
Assistant Secretary, Regulatory Affairs Sector
Assistant Secretary, Social and Cultural Sector
Assistant Secretary, Strategic Communications and Ministerial Affairs Sector
Chief Information Officer, Chief Information Officer Branch
Senior Director, Internal Audit and Evaluation Bureau
Senior General Counsel, Legal Services Branch

The GC 2.0 Program Office in the CIO Branch of Treasury Board Secretariat is responsible for maintaining GCpedia, the Government of Canada internal wiki.

Access to information and privacy 
The Access to Information Act gives Canadian citizens, permanent residents, and any person or corporation present in Canada a right to access records of government institutions that are subject to the Act. The Privacy Act gives Canadian citizens, permanent residents, and individuals present in Canada the right to access their personal information held by government institutions that are subject to the Act. The Treasury Board Secretariat is responsible for issuing direction and guidance to government institutions with respect to the administration of the Access to Information Act and interpretation of this policy.

References

External links
 Treasury Board of Canada Secretariat
 Proactive disclosure reports

Federal departments and agencies of Canada
Canada